Michał Bylina (18 January 1904 – 5 August 1982) was a Polish painter. His work was part of the art competitions at the 1932 Summer Olympics and the 1936 Summer Olympics.

References

External links
 

1904 births
1982 deaths
20th-century Polish painters
20th-century Polish male artists
Olympic competitors in art competitions
Polish male painters